Spilosoma euryphlebia is a moth in the family Erebidae. It was described by George Hampson in 1903. It is found in South Africa.

Description

Male
Head and thorax yellowish white; palpi, a patch on frons, tegulae, patagia, and dorsal stripe on thorax black; pectus and stripes on legs black; mid and hind femora orange above; abdomen orange with dorsal black bands, lateral stripes and ventral series of spots. Forewing yellowish white; the veins rather broadly striped with black especially the medial part of vein 1; narrow stripes in cell and submedian fold; cilia yellow. Hindwing orange vellow.

Wingspan 38 mm.

References

Spilosoma euryphlebia at Markku Savela's Lepidoptera and Some Other Life Forms

Endemic moths of South Africa
Moths described in 1903
euryphlebia